The 2001 Indian Wells Masters was a tennis tournament played on outdoor hard courts. It was the 28th edition of the Indian Wells Masters and was part of the Tennis Masters Series of the 2001 ATP Tour and of Tier I of the 2001 WTA Tour. Both the men's and women's events took place at the Indian Wells Tennis Garden in Indian Wells, California in the United States from March 8 through March 18, 2001.

Champions

Men's singles

 Andre Agassi defeated  Pete Sampras 7–6, 7–5, 6–1
 It was Agassi's 2nd title of the year and the 48th of his career. It was his 1st Masters title of the year and his 11th overall.

Women's singles

 Serena Williams defeated  Kim Clijsters 4–6, 6–4, 6–2
 It was Williams' 2nd title of the year and the 19th of her career. It was her 1st Tier I title of the year and her 2nd overall.

Men's doubles

 Wayne Ferreira /  Yevgeny Kafelnikov defeated  Jonas Björkman /  Todd Woodbridge 6–2, 7–5
 It was Ferreira's 1st title of the year and the 23rd of his career. It was Kafelnikov's 2nd title of the year and the 45th of his career.

Women's doubles

 Nicole Arendt /  Ai Sugiyama defeated  Virginia Ruano Pascual /  Paola Suárez 6–4, 6–4
 It was Arendt's 2nd title of the year and the 15th of her career. It was Sugiyama's 2nd title of the year and the 23rd of her career.

See also
 2001 Indian Wells controversy

References

External links
 
 Association of Tennis Professionals (ATP) tournament profile
 WTA Tournament Profile

 
Indian Wells Masters
Indian Wells Masters
2001
Indian Wells Masters
Indian Wells Masters
Indian Wells Masters